Mirco Müller (also spelled Mirco Mueller; born 21 March 1995) is a Swiss professional ice hockey defenceman who is currently playing with HC Lugano of the National League (NL). He previously played in the National Hockey League (NHL) with the San Jose Sharks and the New Jersey Devils. The Sharks selected Müller in the first round (18th overall) of the 2013 NHL Entry Draft.

Playing career
As a youth, Müller played in the 2008 Quebec International Pee-Wee Hockey Tournament with the Swiss Eastern team.

Müller played for the Kloten Flyers organization between 2010 and 2012, mostly at the junior level. During the 2011–12 season, Müller played seven games in the National League A.

Müller was selected 11th overall by the Everett Silvertips in the 2012 Canadian Hockey League import draft. "Over the last few years, a couple Swiss players played in North America, and they told me how high the playing level is there and I’ve always been interested to play in another country, so I was very happy to be picked by Everett," said Müller.

Müller was selected in the first round, 18th overall, by the San Jose Sharks in the 2013 NHL Entry Draft, and on 22 September 2013, he signed a three-year, entry-level contract with the Sharks, and returned to Everett. He did not play any exhibition games with the Sharks in 2013 due to an injury.

On 17 June 2017, Müller (along with a fifth-round pick in the 2017 NHL Entry Draft) was traded to the New Jersey Devils in exchange for a second and a fourth-round pick in the same draft. On 27 February 2019, Müller was stretchered off the ice due to an injury sustained in a New Jersey home game against the Calgary Flames.

On 1 February 2021, Müller signed a one-year contract with Leksands IF of the Swedish Hockey League (SHL).

International play

Müller played for Switzerland in the 2013 World Junior Ice Hockey Championships in Ufa, Russia. Ahead of the tournament, Müller said, "I'm looking forward to playing against the best players in junior hockey, especially the Canadians, Americans, Swedes and the other top nations. It's in a new country that I've never been to before, and I'm excited to see what it's like over there."

Personal life
Müller is the older brother of hockey player Alina Müller, a forward who plays internationally for the Switzerland women's national ice hockey team.

Career statistics

Regular season and playoffs

International

References

External links

1995 births
Living people
Binghamton Devils players
Everett Silvertips players
EHC Kloten players
Leksands IF players
HC Lugano players
National Hockey League first-round draft picks
New Jersey Devils players
People from Winterthur
San Jose Barracuda players
San Jose Sharks draft picks
San Jose Sharks players
Swiss ice hockey defencemen
Worcester Sharks players
Ice hockey players at the 2022 Winter Olympics
Olympic ice hockey players of Switzerland
Sportspeople from the canton of Zürich